David Klotz is an American composer and music editor. He won eight Primetime Emmy Awards.

Career
David graduated from Emerson College in 1994. He formed a band Fonda, along with Aaron Ryder and Emily Cook. In 2001, he wrote and performed the title song to Robert Rodriguez's film Spy Kids. In 2016, he formed a synth-based band DREAM SYSTEM 8, along with singer Erica Elektra.

In 2020, David co-composed the score for the Netflix film The Prom, along with Matthew Sklar. Most recently he teamed up Morgan Kibby to compose the score for the Netflix series The Watcher.

Selected filmography
As Composer

 2022 – The Watcher
 2021-2022 – American Horror Stories
 2020 – The Prom

 2001 – Close to Home

As Music editor

 2022 – House of the Dragon
 2016-2022 – Stranger Things
 2021 – The Retaliators
 2021 – Halston
 2016-2021 – American Crime Story
 2018-2021 – Pose
 2020 – Ratched
 2020 – Perry Mason
 2020 – Hollywood
 2020 – I Am Not Okay with This
 2019-2020 – The Politician
 2011-2019 – American Horror Story
 2011-2019 – Game of Thrones
 2019 – Valley of the Boom

 2018 – 9-1-1
 2017 – Dirty Dancing
 2017 – Feud
 2016 – Dead of Summer
 2015-2016 – Scream Queens
 2009-2012 – Glee
 2011 – Breakout Kings
 2005-2008 – Prison Break
 2008 – Deception
 2008 – Iron Man
 2006 – Blade: The Series
 2000 – Memento
 1995 – Dead Man Walking

Awards and nominations

References

External links
 

Living people
American film score composers
American male film score composers
20th-century American composers
American television composers
Primetime Emmy Award winners
Year of birth missing (living people)